A list of films produced in Italy in 1911 (see 1911 in film):

External links
 Italian films of 1911 at the Internet Movie Database

1911
Italian
Films